The Reading Room (German - Das Lesekabinett) is an 1843 painting by the Düsseldorf-based painter Johann Peter Hasenclever, now in the Alte Nationalgalerie in Berlin. It shows a genre scene of middle-class men in a reading room, reflecting the political and cultural situation of the Vormärz period. A smaller copy is now in the Städtische Museum Remscheid (Haus Cleff in Remscheid-Hasten).

1843 paintings
German paintings
Paintings in the collection of the Alte Nationalgalerie